Bakken is a village in Iveland municipality in Agder county, Norway.

References

Villages in Agder
Iveland
Setesdal